Kiddie Kandids is a U.S. children's portrait studio based in St. Louis, Missouri. Kiddie Kandids is a nationwide chain, with locations in Babies R Us superstores and malls. The chain is owned and operated by CPI Corp.

References

External links

Kiddie Kandids Website
CPI Corp Website

Photographic studios
Photography companies of the United States